Pio is a masculine given name. People with the name include:

 Padre Pio (1887–1968), stigmatic Capuchin friar, Roman Catholic saint born Francesco Forgione
 Pío Baroja (1872–1956), Spanish writer
 Pío Cabanillas Gallas (1923–1991), Spanish jurist and politician
 Pío Collivadino (1865–1949), Argentine painter
 Pío Corcuera (1921–2011), Argentine footballer
 Pío del Pilar (1860–1931), Filipino revolutionary general
 Pio Fedi (1815–1892), Italian sculptor
Pio Filippani Ronconi (1920–2010) Italian Waffen-SS soldier and orientalist
 Pío García-Escudero (born 1952), Spanish architect and politician
 Pio Joris (1843–1922), Italian painter
 Pio Laghi (1922–2009), Italian Roman Catholic cardinal
 Pio Laporte (1878–1930), Canadian politician and physician
 Pío Leyva (1917–2006), Cuban singer and composer
 Pio Loterio (died 1591), Roman Catholic prelate and Bishop of Fondi
 Pio Marchi (1895–?), Italian footballer
 Pio Marmaï (born 1984), French actor
 Pío Moa (born 1948), Spanish writer and journalist
 Pio Panfili (1723–1812), Italian painter and engraver
 Pio Fabio Paolini (1620–1692), Italian painter
 Pío Pico (1801–1894), Mexican rancher and politician
 Pio Gama Pinto (1927–1965), Kenyan journalist and politician
 Pío del Río Hortega (1882–1945), Spanish neuroscientist
 Pio Sanquirico (1847–1900), Italian painter
 Pio Terei, New Zealand actor, singer and comedian
 Pio Bosco Tikoisuva (born 1947), Fijian former rugby player
 Pio Tuwai (born 1983), Fiji rugby union player
 Pío Valenzuela (1869–1956), Filipino revolutionary leader

See also
 Pia (given name), a feminine given name

Masculine given names